Shepherds Park, is a reserve and sports ground in the suburb of Beach Haven in Auckland, New Zealand. It is the home ground of New Zealand National League and Northern League side Birkenhead United, the Beach Haven Bowling Club, Beach Haven Tennis Club and Shepherds Park Squash Club.

Shepherds Park also hosts cricket games during the summer and is used as one of Birkenhead City Cricket Club's grounds.

History
Shepherd Park was named after the Shepherd family who lived and farmed there for several generations.

Starting in September 2022, Birkenhead United started the upgrades of their club rooms worth around NZD$2.5 million.

In September 2022, Shepherds Park were shortlisted by FIFA to be a team base camp for the 2023 FIFA Women's World Cup. On 12 December 2022, it was announced Shepherds Park would be used as the training ground by Italy during the world cup.

References

Association football venues in New Zealand
Sports venues in Auckland
Association football in Auckland
Kaipātiki Local Board Area